Some U.S. Routes are given directional suffixes to indicate a split of the main route — for instance, U.S. Route 25 (US 25) splits into US 25E (east) and US 25W (west) between Newport, Tennessee and North Corbin, Kentucky, and US 9W is an alternate of U.S. Route 9 between Fort Lee, New Jersey and Albany, New York. These splits were in the U.S. Highway system from the beginning, and were used when two roughly-equivalent routes existed. The American Association of State Highway and Transportation Officials (AASHTO) no longer assigns these numbers, and, in theory, current ones are to be eliminated "as rapidly as the State Highway Department and the Standing Committee on Highways can reach agreement". This policy was adopted by 1996; however, many of these routes still exist, mostly in Tennessee.


List of routes

See also

 List of suffixed Interstate Highways

References

External links